List of governors of Guiana can refer to:

 List of governors of British Guiana
 List of governors of French Guiana
 List of governor-generals of Guyana
 List of colonial governors of Suriname which was sometimes referred to as Dutch Guiana